École polytechnique universitaire d'Aix-Marseille (Polytech Marseille) is a French engineering college created in 2001.

The school trains engineers in the majors:

 biological engineering,
 biomedical,
 civil engineering,
 industrial engineering,
 computer science,
 materials,
 mechanics and energy,
 microelectronics and telecommunications.

Located in Marseille, Polytech Marseille is a public higher education institution. The school is a member of the Aix-Marseille University.

References

External links
 Polytech Marseille

Engineering universities and colleges in France
Polytech Marseille
Marseille
Educational institutions established in 2001
2001 establishments in France